The Nissan RD engine series is basically a Nissan RB engine design, except that it is only a single overhead cam six-cylinder diesel engine. It was the successor to the Nissan LD and SD six-cylinder engines and was joined by the six-cylinder Nissan TD engine.

From 1997 onwards the turbocharged versions were fitted with electronic fuel injection. The turbodiesel version known as the RD28T (or RD28ET with electronic fuel injection) and were also fitted to the Nissan Safari (also known as the Nissan Patrol) off-road vehicle.

Since the Nissan RD engine is based on the Nissan RB engine, they have many similarities and many parts are interchangeable. The engine block was similar to the RB30 engine except it had more material, was heavier and had 85mm bore vs the 86mm bore of the RB30 and a 83mm stroke vs 85mm stroke. The cylinder head was of a non-crossflow design, meaning that the exhaust and intake ports were on one side of the cylinder head.

RD28
 SOHC,  bore

RD28 Series 1
12 valves (two per cylinder).

 at 4,800 rpm at 2,400 rpm

Nissan Skyline R31 series 1985–1987
Nissan Laurel C32 ~ C34 series 1986–1993
Nissan Cedric / Nissan Gloria Y30 ~ Y32 series 1985–1993
Commercial (taxi) Nissan Cedric / Nissan Gloria Y31 series sedan 1987–1999
Nissan Crew K30 series 1993–1999
Nissan Cefiro A31 series 1988–1993

No PCV on the tappet cover.

RD28 Series 2

 at 4,800 rpm at 2,400 rpm

Nissan Cedric / Nissan Gloria Y32 & Y33 series 1993–1999
Nissan Laurel C34 - C35 series 1994–1999

RD28E
 at 4,800 rpm at 2,400 rpm

Commercial (taxi) Nissan Cedric Y31 series sedan 1999.08-2002
Nissan Laurel C35 series 1999–2001
Nissan Crew K30 series 1999-2009

Vacuum pump located on tappet cover.

RD28T
 SOHC turbodiesel
 at 4,400 rpm at 2,400 rpm

Nissan Safari Spirit series Y60 2-door soft-top 1996–1997

Nissan Civilian Bus

RD28ETi1
electronically controlled turbodiesel with an intercooler
 at 4,000 rpm at 2,000 rpm

Nissan Safari Spirit series Y61 2-door soft-top 1997–1999 (automatic transmission)

RD28ETi2
electronically controlled turbodiesel with an intercooler
 at 4,000 rpm at 2,000 rpm

See also
 List of Nissan engines

References

RD
Diesel engines by model
Straight-six engines